Giuseppe Germano Bernardini, O.F.M. Cap (born 27 September 1928) is an Italian prelate of the Catholic Church who worked as a missionary in Muslim-majority countries from 1957 to 2004 and served as Archbishop of Izmir, Turkey, from 1983 to 2004.

Biography
Giuseppe Germano Bernardini was born in Verica, a village in Pavullo nel Frignano, Italy, on 27 September 1928, the son of Sergio and Domenica Bernardini, both declared "Venerable" by Pope Francis in 2015. He was ordained a priest of the Order of Friars Minor Capuchin on 21 March 1953.

His career as a missionary in Muslim countries began in 1957. On 19 December 1966 he was named Ecclesiastical Administrator of Trabzon.

On 22 January 1983, Pope John Paul II appointed him Archbishop of Izmir. He received his episcopal consecration on 9 April from Archbishop Bruno Foresti.

When the Vicariate of Anatolia was erected from the jurisdiction he once led as the Trabzon Mission on 30 November 1990, he was named Apostolic Administrator.

He chaired the Episcopal Conference of Turkey from 1989 to 1992.

On 13 October 1999, addressing a meeting of the Synod of Bishops, the 2nd Special Assembly for Europe, he warned that Islam was intent on dominating Christian Europe. He said: "The 'domination' has already started with petrodollars, used not to create jobs in poor countries in North Africa and the Middle East, but to build mosques and cultural centers in Christian countries ... including Rome, center of Christianity." He advised especially against allowing Muslims to use Christian churches for their services. He called interfaith meetings with Muslims "a dialogue of the deaf".

He retired on 11 October 2004 upon the appointment of his successor, Ruggero Franceschini.

References
 

1928 births
Living people
Religious leaders from the Province of Modena
Italian Roman Catholic missionaries
Franciscan bishops
21st-century Roman Catholic archbishops in Turkey
20th-century Roman Catholic archbishops in Turkey
Italian expatriates in Turkey
Roman Catholic archbishops of Izmir
Italian expatriate bishops